Chinese Estates Holdings Limited is a major Chinese investment holding company, based in Hong Kong.

Its subsidiaries are principally engaged in property investment and development, brokerage, securities investment and money lending. 

The company is organized into five divisions: property development and trading, which is engaged in property development and sales of properties; property leasing, which is engaged in property rental; money lending, which is engaged in loan financing; listed securities investment and treasury products, which is engaged in listed securities investment and trading, over-the counter trading and structured products, and unlisted securities investment, investment holding and brokerage, which is engaged in unlisted securities investment, trading and brokerage. 

Joseph Lau holds a major stake in Chinese Estates Holdings.

On March 13, 2006, the company acquired 100% equity interest of JadeField Limited. On January 5, 2006, it acquired 70.01% equity interest of Moon Ocean Ltd.

External links

Company website
Google financial intelligence tracker

Companies listed on the Hong Kong Stock Exchange
Land developers of Hong Kong
Companies with year of establishment missing